Aržano is a small village in Zagora, Croatia, situated near the border with Bosnia and Herzegovina at an altitude of 650 m. The population is 478 (2011 census).  There is an influx of descendants that arrive during the holiday periods, mainly from the larger cities, Split and Zagreb.

The village is known for having the annual "Josip Jović Memorial Tournament," a 6-a-side soccer tournament honouring the death of local Josip Jović, the first casualty of the 1991-1995 Croatian War of Independence.

Footnotes 

Populated places in Split-Dalmatia County